Monica Seles won in the final 6–1, 3–6, 7–6 against Arantxa Sánchez Vicario.

Seeds
A champion seed is indicated in bold text while text in italics indicates the round in which that seed was eliminated. The top four seeds received a bye to the second round.

  Monica Seles (champion)
  Arantxa Sánchez Vicario (final)
  Conchita Martínez (quarterfinals)
  Kimberly Po (quarterfinals)
  Yayuk Basuki (semifinals)
 n/a
  Patty Schnyder (first round)
  Natasha Zvereva (quarterfinals)
  Henrieta Nagyová (first round)

Draw

Final

Section 1

Section 2

External links
 1997 Toyota Princess Cup Draw

Toyota Princess Cup
1997 WTA Tour